Dark Possession is a paranormal/suspense novel written by American author Christine Feehan. Published in 2007, it is the 18th book in the Dark Series.

Plot summary
In the previous novel, Dark Celebration, Manolito De La Cruz was very close to turning and when he happened upon Mary Ann Delaney he found his lifemate. Unfortunately, at the time she was complaining about Carpathian men and how she would never be with one and would count on the Prince to protect her. Upon hearing this, Manolito manipulates Mary Ann unbeknownst to the others and makes a blood bond and leaves her with no memory of it. Mary Ann is a counselor for battered women and is visiting the Carpathian mountains with her best friend Destiny and her lifemate Nicolae. Upon learning this, Manolito goes to his brother Riordan's lifemate, Juliette, and convinces her to seek out Mary Ann to help her sister back in South America. During the celebration, however, he puts himself between a mage trying to kill a pregnant woman and is mortally injured.

Mary Ann is approached by Juliette De La Cruz who convinces her to go to South America to help counsel her younger sister. However, during the celebration she witnessed the death of a man, Manolito, and can't seem to get over it. She goes to South America but is so depressed and abnormal she is unable to treat Juliette's sister. Manolito is not dead, however, having been saved by the races best healer. He awakens in South America with only the memory of going to the celebration nothing more. He is very sick, the healer had to basically resurrect him from the dead. Riordan attempts to aid him but Manolito's broken mind sees him as a threat. Convinced something is wrong with Manolito, Riordan and Juliette also notice something wrong with Mary Ann. Putting the pieces together they realize that she is the only one who can save Manolito and they set out to aid him.

Mary Ann views herself as just a human, but there is more to her than she realizes. She is able to go head to head with Manolito, who has no memory of creating the blood bond. But Manolito's brain isn't as damaged as they thought, for there is a nefarious plot that could bring both the Carpathian and human worlds crashing down.

Main characters
Manolito De La Cruz
Mary Ann Delaney

Awards and nominations
New York Times Bestseller List
Publishers Weekly Bestseller List
USA Today Bestseller List
Barnes & Noble Mass Market Bestseller List
Borders Bestseller List
Amazon Bestseller List
Booksense Bestseller List
Wall Street Journal Bestseller List
Washington Post Bestseller List

External links
Read Chapter 1

References 

2007 American novels
Novels by Christine Feehan
American vampire novels
Berkley Books books